Line 3 Scarborough (originally known as the Scarborough RT or SRT) is a light rapid transit line that is part of the Toronto subway system in Toronto, Ontario, Canada.

Rather than the larger manually operated subway trains used on the other lines in the system, the rolling stock of Line 3 consists of smaller, semi-automated, medium-capacity trains. Designated by the Toronto Transit Commission (TTC) as the S series, these are Intermediate Capacity Transit System (ICTS) Mark I trains built by the Urban Transportation Development Corporation (UTDC). The trains are powered by linear induction motors and operate on  tracks, unlike the city's subway lines and the Toronto streetcar system, which use the unique .

The line has remained mostly unchanged since its opening in 1985 and contains two of the least-used stations in the system. Since the late 2000s, the municipal government of Toronto has been debating competing plans to revitalize and expand the line, to convert its right-of-way for use by modern light rail vehicles, or to close the line and extend Line 2 Bloor–Danforth farther into Scarborough along a different route. In 2013, Toronto City Council decided on a three-station extension of Line 2 to replace Line 3 along a different route. In 2016, in order to free up funds for another transit project, the city reduced the extension to include only one station, which was set to be completed by 2026. In 2019, Progressive Conservative premier Doug Ford reinstated the three-station Scarborough subway extension and committed to completing it by 2030, with all construction costs to be borne by the province.

The line is set to close permanently in 2023 after an initial recommendation was approved by the TTC board in February 2021. Until the Line 2 extension to the existing Scarborough Centre station is completed (estimated 2030), shuttle buses will run in place of Line 3 service. A portion of the existing track between Kennedy and Ellesmere stations will be converted to a bus right-of-way, which is set to be completed by 2025.

Name 

From when the line opened in 1985 until 2015, it was known as the "Scarborough RT" or "SRT". The "RT" in Scarborough RT stood for "rapid transit". The name Scarborough Line is used on the official TTC website and 2014 TTC Ride Guide. In October 2013, the TTC announced plans to give the lines official numbers to help riders and visitors to navigate the system. The line is numbered 3, as it is the third rapid transit line to open in the system. New signage was installed in March 2014. In 2015, the name was simplified to "Line 3 Scarborough."

History 

In 1972, the provincial government announced the GO-Urban plan to build an intermediate capacity transit system across suburban Toronto, particularly in Scarborough and Etobicoke, using the experimental Krauss-Maffei Transurban. However, KraussMaffei was forced to abandon development when the West German federal government declined further funding. GO-Urban then used some of the technologies from the Transurban to develop a simpler steel-wheeled version, the ICTS system.

During this period, the TTC had been working on plans to extend its own network with a series of streetcar systems using a new and greatly enlarged streetcar design, the Canadian Light Rail Vehicle (CLRV). The Ontario government, in charge of GO Transit, was looking for a test site for the ICTS system and demanded that the TTC use it for one of their planned streetcar projects, selecting the Scarborough extension. The TTC initially refused to make the change, arguing it was both the wrong solution and that since the construction of the line had already commenced this would be a waste of money. However, as the Ontario government was providing 75 percent of the funding for the line, they changed their minds when the government threatened to cut the funding.

At Kennedy station, there are clues revealing that it was originally built for streetcar operation; it is possible to see old low-level streetcar platforms protruding under the current high-level platforms, and the loop to turn streetcars proved too sharp for safe operation of the ICTS cars, which did not have a reason to turn around, so the loop was replaced by a Spanish solution-like crossover. Ontario wanted to develop and promote its new technology, which had been designed for a proposed urban GO Transit service known as GO-ALRT. Changes to federal railway regulations had made the new system unnecessary for GO, so the government hoped to sell it to other transit services in order to recoup its investment.

The Scarborough line opened in March 1985 as the Scarborough RT. Three years after it opened, the TTC renovated its southwestern terminus at Kennedy station, because the looped turnaround track, designed for uni-directional streetcars under the earlier plan and not needed for the bi-directional ICTS trains, was causing derailments; it was replaced with a single terminal track and the station was thus quasi-Spanish solution, with one side for boarding and another side for alighting, though the boarding side is also used for alighting during off-peak hours, weekends and holidays.

With the line approaching the end of its useful life, the TTC reduced the frequency of service in mid-September 2012 to reduce wear and tear on both the aging rolling stock and the infrastructure.

In 2015, the TTC started work on the cars to keep them operational until the line is replaced by another mode of rail technology. This included shrink-wrapping the rolling stock with a blue vinyl finish to emphasize the line's colour and displaying the number 3, a linear diagram of the Scarborough line, and the TTC logo. The original "RT" logo was no longer featured on the trains, except when the Line 3 shrink wrap is removed but not re-applied yet. These were followed by interior upgrades, such as using coloured velour seating.

As of December 13, 2016, with the Presto fare gates installed at Lawrence East station, all stations along this line are Presto-enabled.

On April 18, 2017, the TTC awarded a $6.8-million contract to Bombardier to repair corrosion damage under the floors of the S-series cars. If the problem were not rectified, there would be the risk of serious structural damage to the cars. That would have prevented the cars from lasting until 2026 when the Scarborough Subway Extension was scheduled to replace Line 3. The repair work required service to be reduced from 6 four-car trains down to 5.

Rolling stock

The 7 four-car trains used exclusively on the Scarborough line were developed by the Urban Transportation Development Corporation (UTDC), then an Ontario Crown corporation but later sold to Bombardier Transportation. The business proposal initially bore little fruit—a proposed pilot project in Hamilton was cancelled after meeting widespread public opposition, and the only other transit systems to use the technology, named the Intermediate Capacity Transit System (ICTS), at the time were Vancouver's SkyTrain and the People Mover in Detroit. After Bombardier took over UTDC, it redesigned the technology with newer, longer cars, used to expand the SkyTrain network and also for new installations across the world. ICTS was rebranded as "Advanced Rapid Transit" (ART) and became a success for the company. Later, the technology was again rebranded, this time as Innovia Metro.

One unusual feature of the ICTS cars is that they are driven by linear induction motors: instead of using conventional motors to turn the wheels, they push themselves along the route using alternating flat magnets reacting with the distinctive diamagnetic aluminum metal plate that runs down the centre of the tracks. This system requires very few moving parts and therefore leads to lower maintenance costs. When the car motors are accelerating, they actually lift the car off the track an extremely small distance, repelling against the aluminum plate. This micro-lifting prevents the truck wheels from making a solid electrical contact with the track.  Instead of using the conventional method, in which motive power is supplied by a single third rail, with return current travelling through the running rails, a separate positive and negative power rail are provided on one side of the track. With respect to the accelerating trucks and the micro-lifting, the truck wheels have a somewhat larger flange than normal in order to keep the car inline on the track during the micro-lifting. The linear induction motors also allow the cars to climb steeper grades than would be possible with traditional subway technology since wheel slip is not an issue.

The trains are also able to be operated exclusively by computers, becoming one of the earliest installations of Standard Elektrik Lorenz's "SelTrac IS" system (now owned and delivered by Thales Rail Signalling Solutions), doing away with the need for a human operator. However, due to opposition from the transit workers' union and public perception, operators were retained; the union has firmly opposed driverless trains. (Other systems took full advantage of the automated operation and Vancouver's SkyTrain has been automated since 1985 without incident.) The Line 3 trains have had only one operator since inception. In practice, the Scarborough line trains drive themselves; the operator monitors their operations and controls the doors. One of the features which was not implemented at the time of Scarborough line's opening was the automated audible-only next-stop announcement system, which was introduced in January 2008 and meant operators were no longer required to announce stops manually. These announcements feature the voice of Susan Bigioni, a TTC employee, who also voiced the announcements for the T1 series and the retired H4, H5, and H6 trains.

Track

Line 3 uses 5-rail track, which a TTC document describes as follows:

The two power rails of 300 volts positive DC and the other of 300 volts negative DC together produce 600 volts.

Line 3 tracks use standard gauge rather than the broader Toronto gauge used on Line 2 Bloor–Danforth, as the ICTS design for the line would not allow for the interchange of rail equipment between lines 2 and 3 even if they were both the same gauge.

Route

The line follows a roughly upside-down L-shaped route when viewed northwards: first northward from Kennedy station, paralleling the Canadian National Railway / GO Transit's Stouffville line tracks, between Kennedy Road and Midland Avenue,  to Ellesmere Road; then eastward between Ellesmere Road and Progress Avenue, through Scarborough City Centre to McCowan Road. The north–south section of the route, where it follows the Stouffville line tracks, is at ground level; the shorter east–west section (except for the ground-level yard) is elevated, as is the Kennedy terminus. The line dives briefly underground just north of Ellesmere station to cross under the Stouffville line tracks. After that, it is elevated towards McCowan station. Two stations, Kennedy and Scarborough Centre, have accessible elevators as those two are the busiest stations of Line 3.

From 2 a.m. to 6 a.m. (to 8 a.m. on Sundays), when Line 3 is not operating, the 302 Kingston Rd-McCowan Blue Night bus serves the same area. The 302 originates at Bingham Loop, where it connects with the 322 Coxwell bus that travels to the west, as well as Route 324 Victoria Park that runs north. From the loop, Route 302 travels east along Kingston Road to Brimley Road, then north along Brimley Road to Danforth Road, then north on McCowan Road to Steeles Avenue. With the exception of McCowan station, it does not pass near any of the rapid transit stations, though other night bus services pass near stations. Bus service is extended on Sundays because the rapid transit lines start at 8 a.m. (beginning January 3, 2016) instead of the usual 6 a.m. start. Service frequency is 30 minutes.

The frequency for this line is 4–5 minutes during peak periods and 5–6 minutes during off-peak periods.

Operations
The TTC operates five to six trains on the line with each train consisting of four cars. There are 28 cars in the Line 3 fleet.

Line 3 trains can switch directions only at the ends of the line as there are no intermediate crossovers between the two termini. Thus, there can be no short turns on Line 3.

In winter, during heavy snow or freezing rain, the TTC previously ran "storm trains" overnight on Line 3 to keep power rails clear of ice, and apply anti-freeze to the power rail once freezing rain starts. However, since the winter of 2018–2019, the TTC decided to change its procedures for Line 3. Thus, about two hours before an expected storm, the TTC may decide to shut down Line 3 and replace it with bus service. Just before the storm of February 2, 2022, the TTC replaced all Line 3 trains with 25 buses.

The Scarborough line's S-series ICTS trains are stored and serviced at the small McCowan Yard, located east of McCowan station. Basic maintenance is performed in this yard; for more extensive work, the cars are taken to the subway's Greenwood Yard by truck, given the train's different track gauge and propulsion system.

Future

After studying the revitalization and expansion of Line 3 in 2006, its replacement with alternate transit (light rail versus subway) became a subject of debate in the late 2000s. , there are plans to replace Line 3 with the three-stop Scarborough Subway Extension of Line 2 from Kennedy station to Sheppard Avenue, with intermediate stops at Lawrence Avenue and Scarborough Town Centre. With an estimated completion between 2029 and 2030, the extension would follow a different route than Line 3. The Province of Ontario has committed to fully fund its $5.5-billion cost. In February 2021, the TTC recommended closing Line 3 permanently by 2023 and replacing it with bus service until the Line 2 extension opens. Once Line 3 is closed, portions of its right-of-way could be converted into parkland.

Revitalization and expansion

In 2006, a study was completed on the prospects of the Scarborough line. It recommended upgrading the line to handle larger ART Mark II vehicles, at a cost of $190million (in 2006 dollars) with an eight-month service suspension for the upgrade and to purchase $170million of new rolling stock. Rebuilding the curve in the tunnel north of Ellesmere station would have been required to accommodate Mark II cars. (According to transit advocate Steve Munro, the need to rebuild the tunnel was discovered after the $190million upgrade estimate was made.) The TTC Board approved the recommended plan for the upgrades on August 30, 2006, but later cancelled the plans. Extending Line 2 Bloor–Danforth, either along the current route or along a different alignment directly to Scarborough Centre station, was not considered cost-effective or justifiable.

In November 2015, transportation consultant and University of Toronto professor emeritus Richard Soberman argued that it would be vastly cheaper and faster to buy new Line 3 vehicles than to replace Line 3 with an extension of Line 2 northeast from Kennedy station. He felt the cost savings would be great enough to overcome difficulties such as the incompatibility of Mark II cars with the existing line geometry and the extra cost of building a fully separated right-of-way to Sheppard Avenue, where Line 3 could connect with either a proposed extension of Line 4 Sheppard or the Sheppard East LRT.

Replacement with alternate transit

The TTC and the City of Toronto completed an environmental assessment in 2010 to convert the line to light rail transit and extend it to Malvern from its current eastern terminus, McCowan, with potential new intermediate stations at Bellamy Road, Centennial College's Progress Campus and Sheppard Avenue with a possible additional station at Brimley Road between the existing Midland and Scarborough Centre stations.

After initially planning to include the line with the proposed Eglinton Crosstown LRT line and create a single line called the "Eglinton–Scarborough Crosstown line", Metrolinx proceeded with plans to convert the line to light rail and extend it to Sheppard Avenue with a single new intermediate station at Centennial College. The existing line would have closed after the 2015 Pan American Games and be completed in 2020. In January 2013, Infrastructure Ontario issued a request for qualifications to shortlist companies to construct both this line and the Eglinton Crosstown line. The Eglinton Crosstown line was later renamed Line 5 Eglinton and officially given the colour of orange.

In June 2013, Toronto City Council again debated having the Scarborough line replaced with an extension of Line 2 Bloor–Danforth north to Sheppard Avenue along a different right of way. Metrolinx issued a letter to Toronto City Council indicating it would cease work on the Scarborough portion of the line, because its position strayed from the original LRT agreement. The subway alternative would cost between $500million and $1billion more than converting the Scarborough line to use the same rolling stock as the Eglinton Crosstown line be so it could be a continuation of that line. The Globe and Mail reported that Scarborough councillors had argued that providing Scarborough residents with light rail, not heavy rail, treated them as "second class citizens".

Two competing subway plans were proposed to replace Line 3. TTC chair Karen Stintz proposed extending Line 2 Bloor–Danforth to the east before turning north, with three new stations at Lawrence Avenue and McCowan Road (primarily to serve the Scarborough Hospital's General Campus), at Scarborough Town Centre and then at Sheppard Avenue East and McCowan Road, where it would connect to the Sheppard East LRT. Transportation Minister Glen Murray made an alternative proposal to extend Line 2 along the Line 3 route but have it terminate at Scarborough Town Centre. Under the Murray plan, there would be only two stations and there would be no direct connection with the then-proposed Sheppard East LRT. The Murray plan would have required the relocation of Kennedy station as a new northbound curve from the existing Kennedy station would have been too tight for subway trains. It would also have required the complete shutdown of the line during construction, something that the Stintz plan avoided.

On October 8, 2013, Toronto City Council voted 24–20 to replace the Scarborough line with a three-station extension of the Bloor–Danforth subway line. Council chose the Stintz plan for the extension.

In 2013, the rejected LRT proposal would have provided a  line with 7 stops serving 47,000 residents within walking distance. In 2013, the LRT was estimated to cost $1.48 billion to build versus $3.56 billion for the Line 2 extension; both estimates would subsequently increase.

Converting Line 3 to light rail would require the complete shutdown of the line while extending Line 2 could occur without requiring a Line 3 shutdown. Circa 2013, this was promoted as a major benefit of the Line 2 extension over a conversion to light rail. At the time, the TTC estimated it could keep Line 3 operating until 2026; however, in February 2021, the TTC recommended replacing Line 3 with buses, thus eliminating that benefit. A remaining benefit of the subway option is that it would eliminate the need to change trains at Kennedy station.

In June 2016, city planning staff proposed the elimination of two of the three stops along the planned Scarborough Subway Extension which would have seen Line 2 Bloor–Danforth terminate at Scarborough Town Centre in order to free up funding for a proposed Crosstown East LRT line extension of Line 5 Eglinton. The eliminated intermediate stops were at Lawrence Avenue and Sheppard Avenue. Subsequently, the cost estimate for the one-stop subway extension increased to $3.2billion, leaving the Crosstown East LRT unfunded. Given the rising cost for the subway extension and the loss of funding for the LRT line, a group of city councillors led by Josh Matlow reopened the subway versus LRT debate. Matlow proposed scrapping the one-stop subway extension in order to provide funding for 24 LRT stops on two LRT lines within Scarborough. TTC CEO Andy Byford said the cost of the LRT line following the Line 3 route may have risen to as high as $3billion because of "delays and redesign" since 2013, but Brad Ross, also of the TTC, warned of "caveats around numbers and assumptions" associated with that estimate. After Council's vote, Byford admitted that the cost estimates for "delays" was unnecessary, which assumed the LRT's completion would be in 2026, the same date as the subway option. However, according to Michael Warren, a former TTC chief general manager, the LRT could have been completed in 2020 at a cost of $1.8billion, an estimate not presented to City Council when it voted. There was also the issue of whether there would be space for both expanded GO service and an LRT north of Kennedy station; however, Metrolinx subsequently denied there would be such a problem. On July 13, Toronto City Council voted down Matlow's proposal by a margin of roughly 2 to 1.

Councillor Glenn De Baeremaeker justified the subway extension saying "Scarborough residents need the same access to a subway system that everybody else already has." Mayor Tory was concerned that switching from subway to LRT would delay transit improvements in Scarborough, and might not get support from senior levels of government. In September 2013, Metrolinx prepared a draft report comparing the subway and LRT options concluding that the subway option was "not a worthwhile use of money." Metrolinx had declined a TTC request to give an opinion prior to City Council's July 2016 vote.

In 2017, the estimated cost of the one-stop Line 2 extension was $3.35billion, which increased to $3.9billion by April 2019. On April 10, 2019, Premier Doug Ford announced that the province would revert the extension back to the 3-stop proposal at an estimated cost of $5.5billion with an estimated completion date between 2029 and 2030. Line 2 would also receive new subway trains as part of the extension.

End-of-life plan 
The three-stop subway proposal was revived and revised on April 10, 2019, by Ontario premier Doug Ford, to be completed between 2029 and 2030 at a cost of $5.5billion.

On December 10, 2020, Toronto mayor John Tory stated that Line 3 would fail and be taken out of service before the Scarborough Subway Extension was completed, with the failure possibly happening several years before completion. At that point, the Line 3 vehicles were 35 years old, well past their 25-year life expectancy, and had become unreliable and difficult to maintain, leading to reduced service and frequent service interruptions. The TTC was looking into an alternative solution of replacing Line 3 with bus service but refused to answer questions after the mayor's announcement, referring instead to a report expected in February 2021.

In February 2021, the TTC recommended shutting down Line 3 permanently in 2023 and replacing it with bus service. The TTC rejected doing a third overhaul of the line because it would cost $522.4million and might not improve the reliability of the line. The TTC offered two bus replacement options: purchase 60 hybrid buses by 2023 for $374.8million, or reduce the number of spares for maintenance deferring the purchase of new buses until 2027 to 2030, at a cost of $357.4million. Line 3's ultimate replacement, the Scarborough Subway Extension of Line 2, would not be ready until 2030 at the earliest.

Existing infrastructure
In April 2022, the TTC recommended that the Line 3 right-of-way between Kennedy and Ellesmere stations be converted into a  dedicated busway after Line 3 closes in late 2023. The conversion would take two years to complete and cost $49.5 million. An additional $60 million would be required to modify the bus platforms at Kennedy and Scarborough Centre stations. There would be stops along the right-of-way at Mooregate Avenue / Tara Avenue (approximately halfway between Eglinton Avenue and Lawrence Avenue), Lawrence Avenue East and Ellesmere Road. Between the proposed Ellesmere stop and Scarborough Centre station, buses would operate along Ellesmere Road and Brimley Road.  and McCowan stations and the connecting guideway would be permanently shut down as they were not usable for a busway. A trip between Scarborough Centre and Kennedy stations would take 15 minutes using the proposed busway versus 25 minutes for on-street buses, which would need to be used until the busway was ready; with Line 3, the same trip took 10 minutes.

One of the TTC's redevelopment proposals for the Line 3 lands was to convert the corridor, including the elevated section between Midland and McCowan stations, into a linear park. This proposed park would be similar to the High Line in Manhattan, New York City.

References

External links

 Scarborough Subway Extension (SSE) about three-stop SSE, published by Metrolinx
 Line 2 Subway Scarborough about now cancelled plan for one-stop SSE, published by City of Toronto
 The future of TTC's Line 3 Scarborough (SRT) about bus replacement for Line 3, published by the TTC in February 2021

ART people movers
Proposed public transport in the Greater Toronto Area
Linear motor metros
Railway lines opened in 1985
1985 establishments in Ontario
Transport in Scarborough, Toronto
3
Linear induction motors
Rapid transit lines in Canada
Standard gauge railways in Canada